Forever by Your Side is the 13th studio album of American popular R&B vocal group the Manhattans, originally released in 1983 by Columbia Records. The album was recorded at Celestial Sound Studios (New York, NY), Studio Sound Recorders (North Hollywood), Universal Recording Studio (Chicago, III) and produced by George Tobin Productions Inc, Leo Graham Enterprises, Mighty M. Productions Ltd. This album brought the two singles by The Manhattans of 1983: the song "Crazy" and the title track "Forever by Your Side". The ballad "Crazy" was the big hit of this album, peaked at #4 on the R&B chart. The love song "Forever by Your Side" had moderate success in the United States, peaked at #30 on the R&B chart, but has become a great success and a romantic classic in Brazil two years later, when she was part of the soundtrack of a soap opera in the country in 1985. Another highlight of this album was the song "Just The Lonely Talking Again", which was later re-recorded by Whitney Houston in 1987, on her second studio album Whitney. The original release of "Forever by Your Side" from 1983 in Vinyl LP has only eight tracks. In 2014, the album was remastered on CD with the caption "Expanded Edition" and brought five bonus tracks, totaling 13 tracks. These bonus tracks include the single version of "Crazy", "Just The Lonely Talking Again" and "Love Is Gonna Find You", with shorter durations than the original songs on the album. There is also the instrumental version of great success "Crazy", without the voices of The Manhattans. The final track number 13, "Lovin' You Did not Come Easy", was also recorded by The Manhattans, but, curiously, was never released in any album of the group. The song was released in 2014 remastered as a previously unreleased song, over thirty years after it was recorded.

Track listing

Charts

Album

Singles

Personnel

01. "Crazy" (4:52)
Writers: John V. Anderson, Steve Williams, Steve Horton
Producers: John V. Anderson, Steve Williams
Executive Producers: Morrie Brown
Drum Programming (Linn): John V. Anderson, Steve Williams
Drums: Leslie Ming
Electric Bass: Wayne Brathwaite
Electric Piano (Rhodes): John V. Anderson
Guitar: Steve Williams
Keyboards: John V. Anderson
Piano: John V. Anderson
Synthesizer (Moog): John V. Anderson

02. "Start All Over Again" (4:35)
Writers: Lotti Golden, Richard Scher
Producer: Morrie Brown
Arrangers: Morrie Brown, Ralph Schuckett
Arranger (Strings): Ralph Schuckett
Backing Vocals: Ike Floyd, Janet Wright, Krystal Davis
Co-producer (Associate): Richard Scher
Drum Programming (Linn): Morrie Brown, Richard Scher
Drums (Additional): Leslie Ming
Electric Bass (Fender): Neil Jason
Piano: Richard Scher
Guitar: Ira Siegel
Percussion: Richard Scher, Steve Goldman
Synthesizer (Memory Moog): Richard Scher
Electric Piano (Fender Rhodes): Richard Scher
Strings: Diana Halprin, Eugene J. Moye Jr., Guy Lumia, Harry Cykman, Jesse Levy, Max Ellen, Regis Iandorio, Sanford Allen

03. "Forever by Your Side" (4:27)
Writers: Marc Blatte, Larry Gottlieb
Producers: Marc Blatte, Larry Gottlieb
Arrangers: (Rhythm & Vocals): Marc Blatte, Larry Gottlieb, Ralph Schuckett
Arranger: (Strings): Ralph Schuckett
Drum Programming (Linn Programming): Ralph Schuckett
Acoustic Guitar: Ira Siegel
Electric Bass: Wayne Brathwaite
Percussion: Sue Evans
Piano: Ralph Schuckett
Strings: Eugene Moye, Gerald Tarack, Guy Lumia, Jesse Levy, Max Ellen, Regis Landiorio, Richard Henrickson, Sanford Allen

04. "Just The Lonely Talking Again" (4:52)
Writer: Sam Dees
Producers: Joe McEwon, Leo Graham, Morrie Brown
Arranger: James Mack
Bass: Paul Richmond, Russell Keating
Conductor: James Mack
Drums: Morris Jennings
Electric Piano (Fender Rhodes): James Mack
Guitar: Byron Gregory, Ira Siegel
Percussion: Steve Goldman
Piano: Theodis Rodgers
Synthesizer: Ed Tossing, Steve Goldman

05. "Locked Up In Your Love" (4:40)
Writers: John V. Anderson, Steve Williams
Producers: John V. Anderson, Steve Williams
Arrangers (Vocals & Rhythm): John V. Anderson, Steve Williams
Arranger (Strings & Reed): John V. Anderson
Drum Programming (Linn): John V. Anderson, Steve Williams
Backing Vocals: Ike Floyd, Krystal Davis, Phillip Ballou
Synthesizer (Bass): John V. Anderson
Flute: Louis Cortelezzi
Guitar: Steve Williams
Keyboards: John V. Anderson
Percussion: Steve Croon 
Piano: John V. Anderson
Saxophone: Louis Cortelezzi
Strings: Eugene Moye, Gerald Tarack, Guy Lumia, Jesse Levy, Max Ellen, Regis Landiorio, Richard Henrickson, Sanford Allen

06. "Lover's Paradise" (4:27)
Writers: Gary Goetzman, Mike Piccirillo
Producer: George Tobin
Producer (Associate): Mike Piccirillo
Bass: Scott Edwards
Drums: Ed Greene
Guitar: Mike Piccirillo
Keyboards: Bill Cuomo
Saxophone: Joel Peskin
Synthesizer: Mike Piccirillo

07. "Love Is Gonna Find You" (5:05)
Writers: Leo Graham, Paul Richmond
Producer: Leo Graham
Arranger: James Mack
Bass: Paul Richmond, Russell Keating
Conductor: James Mack
Drums: Morris Jennings
Electric Bass (Fender): James Mack
Guitar: Byron Gregory
Piano: Theodis Rodgers
Synthesizer: Ed Tossing

08. "I'm Ready To Love You Again" (4:16)
Writers: Gloria Sklerov, Mark Holden, Peter Hamilton
Producer: Leo Graham
Arranger: James Mack
Bass: Paul Richmond, Russell Keating
Conductor: James Mack
Drums: Morris Jennings
Electric Bass (Fender): James Mack
Piano: Theodis Rodgers
Synthesizer: Ed Tossing

Credits
Co-producer (Production Assistance): Brenda Ferrell (track 6)
Coordinator (Artist / Musician Interviews): Randy Mahon
Coordinator (Production): Brad Schmidt (track 6)
Coordinator (Reissue): Jeff James, Leo Sacks
Coordinator (Release): Craig Turnbull
Design: Audrey Satterwhite, John Berg
Design (Reissue Package): Wallace Create
Design, Typography (Hand Lettering): John Pistilli
Engineer (Celestial Sounds; Additional): Chuck Ange (tracks: 1 to 3, 5, 9, 10), Steve Addabbo (tracks: 1 to 5, 9, 10, 12)
Engineer (Celestial Sounds; Assistant): Dean Cochren (tracks: 1 to 3, 5, 9, 10), Larry DeCarmine (tracks: 1 to 3, 5, 9, 10)
Engineer (Celestial Sounds): Steve Goldman (tracks: 1 to 5, 9, 10, 12)
Engineer (Universal Recording Studios): Mike Ferraro (tracks: 4, 7, 8, 11, 12), Stu Walder (tracks: 4, 7, 8, 11, 12)
Liner Notes, Research: Matt Bauer
Management: Gerald Delet
Mastered by: Herb Powers
Mixed by: Michael Hutchinson (tracks: 4, 12), Steve Goldman (tracks: 1 to 3, 5, 9, 10)
Photography by: David Kennedy
Production Manager [Reissue]: Matt Murphy
Recorded by: Hal Helleman (track 6)
Recorded by (Additional, Assistant): Alan Hirshberg (track 6)
Recorded by (Additional): Les Brockman (track 6)
Reissue Producer: Tony Calvert
Remastered by: Sean Brennan
Supervised by (Direction): Gary Goetzman (track 6)

Companies
Phonographic Copyright: Columbia Records
Copyright: Funkytowngrooves USA
Manufactured by: Sony Music Entertainment
Marketed by: Funkytowngrooves Ltd
Distributed by: Funkytowngrooves Ltd
Produced for: George Tobin Productions Inc.
Produced for: Leo Graham Enterprises
Produced for: Mighty M. Productions Ltd.
Recorded at: Celestial Sound Studios, New York, NY
Recorded at: Studio Sound Recorders
Recorded at: Universal Recording Studio
Mixed at: Celestial Sound Studios, New York, NY
Mixed at: Sigma Sound Studios, New York
Mastered at: Frankford/Wayne Mastering Labs
Remastered at: Battery Studios, New York

Final Notes
Originally released on Columbia Records, 1983.
Recorded at Celestial Sound Studios (New York, NY), Studio Sound Recorders (North Hollywood), Universal Recording Studio (Chicago, III), 1983.
Mixed at Celestial Sound Studios (New York, NY), 1983.
The bonus track number 13 "Lovin' You Didn't Come Easy" was never released. It was only launched in 2014 as previously unreleased track.
2014 Funkytowngrooves USA, this compilation 2014 Columbia Records, a division of Sony Music Entertainment.

References

External links
 

1983 albums
The Manhattans albums
Columbia Records albums
Albums produced by Leo Graham (songwriter)